Shioya may refer to:

Shioya, Tochigi, town in Tochigi Prefecture, Japan
Shioya Station (disambiguation), train stations in Japan
Shioya (surname)